Amir Kola (also Romanized as Amīr Kolā and Amīr Kalā) is a village in Deraz Kola Rural District, Babol Kenar District, Babol County, Mazandaran Province, Iran. At the 2006 census, its population was 466, in 158 families.

References 

Populated places in Babol County